The Ranfurly Shield, colloquially known as the Log o' Wood, is perhaps the most prestigious trophy in New Zealand's domestic rugby union competition. First played for in 1904, the Ranfurly Shield is based on a challenge system, rather than a league or knockout competition as with most football trophies. The holding union must defend the Shield in challenge matches, and if a challenger defeats them, they become the new holder of the Shield. Hawkes Bay were the most successful team during this period with 24 successful defences which was, at that stage, a record.

Holders

Fixtures

1920

1921

1922

1923

1924

1925

1926

1927

1928

1929

Table footnotes

References

https://web.archive.org/web/20100525103211/http://www.scrum.co.nz/Ranfurly_Shield_1920-1929.asp

External links
 Ranfurly Shield at nzrugby.com

1920-29
1920 in New Zealand rugby union
1921 in New Zealand rugby union
1922 in New Zealand rugby union
1923 in New Zealand rugby union
1924 in New Zealand rugby union
1925 in New Zealand rugby union
1926 in New Zealand rugby union
1927 in New Zealand rugby union
1928 in New Zealand rugby union
1929 in New Zealand rugby union